Seringueiras is a municipality located in the Brazilian state of Rondônia. Its population was 11,851 (2020) and its area is 3,774 km².

References

Municipalities in Rondônia